The Richmond Spiders football program is a college football team that represents the University of Richmond in the National Collegiate Athletic Association's Colonial Athletic Association.  The Spiders have had 36 different coaches since they began play in 1881, with several individuals having served multiple stints as head coach.

M. C. Taylor (1881)
C. M. Hazen (1882, 1885–1886)
H. R. Hundley (1887)
C. M. Hazen (1888)
Frank Johnson (1889)
C. T. Taylor (1890)
Dana Rucker (1891)
Penwick Shelton (1892)
Dana Rucker (1893–1895)
Bill Wertenbaker (1897)
Oscar Lee Owens (1898)
Julien Hill (1899)
Ed Kenna (1900)
Garnett Nelson (1901)
Graham Hobson (1902)
Fred Vail (1903)
Harry Wall (1904)
E. A. Dunlap (1905–1909)
E. V. Long (1910)
Sam Honaker (1911)
E. A. Dunlap (1912)
Frank Dobson (1913–1917)
Robert Marshall (1918)
Frank Dobson (1919–1933)
Glenn Thistlethwaite (1934–1941)
John Fenion (1942)
Malcolm Pitt (1943–1944)
George Hope (1945)
John Fenion (1946–1947)
Karl Esleeck (1948–1950)
Ed Merrick (1951–1965)
Frank Jones (1966–1973)
Jim Tait (1974–1979)
Dal Shealy (1980–1988)
Jim Marshall (1989–1994)
Jim Reid (1995–2003)
Dave Clawson (2004–2007)
Mike London (2008–2009)
Latrell Scott (2010)
Wayne Lineburg (2011)
Danny Rocco (2012–2016)
Russ Huesman (2017–)

References

Richmond

Richmond Spiders football coaches